Bukówka Lake is a retention reservoir located in the drainage basin of the River Bóbr, in the Gmina Lubawka, Kamienna Góra County, Lower Silesian Voivodeship; in Poland.

References

Lakes of Poland